Madurai is a city serving as the gateway to southern Tamil Nadu and is the second largest city in the state. It is also the headquarters of the 
Madurai railway division, which is the largest railway division of the southern Railway zone in India. The city has several train stations, of which the Madurai Junction is the most important.

List of Railway Stations in Madurai

See also
 Transport in Madurai

References

 

Madurai